Leśniakowizna  is a village in the administrative district of Gmina Wołomin, within Wołomin County, Masovian Voivodeship, in east-central Poland.

Leśniakowizna has a population of 465

References

Villages in Wołomin County